John Frederick Felske (born May 30, 1942) is an American former professional baseball catcher, coach, and manager in Major League Baseball (MLB). Felske reached the big leagues as a player with the Chicago Cubs and Milwaukee Brewers (–). Most notably, he was the manager of the Philadelphia Phillies, where he achieved a record of 190 victories and 194 defeats (.495), across all or part of three seasons (– and the first 61 games of ), before being succeeded by Lee Elia.

Playing career
After attending the University of Illinois, Felske signed with the Chicago Cubs in 1961, but his shortcomings as a batter—and the durability of Chicago backstop Randy Hundley—kept him at the minor league level except for two at bats in the middle of the  season.

Overall, Felske, a right-handed hitter, batted only .135 in his major league career with 14 hits and one home run, hit on June 1, 1972, against Lindy McDaniel in a 9–8 Brewer win over the New York Yankees at Milwaukee County Stadium.

Manager and coach

He was promoted to the Phillies' coaching staff for the 1984 season as heir apparent to their skipper Paul Owens, who also was the club's general manager. Owens resigned his managing post September 30 of that season, and Felske took over the helm. However, the Phillies—1983 National League champions—were in rapid decline. Hall of Fame left-hander Steve Carlton was coming to the end of his career, and youngsters called up to replace aging veterans fell short of expectations.

The 1985 Phillies won only 75 games, and Felske bore the brunt of criticism from fans and media. While the 1986 club improved to second place in the NL East Division and 86 wins, it finished  games behind the frontrunning rival and eventual champion New York Mets. Meanwhile, the team's front office turned over with Owens' retirement. In 1987, when the Phillies won only 29 of their first 61 games on their way to a fourth-place finish, Felske was fired June 18.

References

External links

1942 births
Living people
Baseball players from Illinois
Chicago Cubs players
Dallas–Fort Worth Spurs players
Evansville Triplets players
Fort Worth Cats players
Illinois Fighting Illini baseball players
Major League Baseball bench coaches
Major League Baseball bullpen coaches
Major League Baseball catchers
Milwaukee Brewers players
Palatka Cubs players
Philadelphia Phillies coaches
Philadelphia Phillies managers
Portland Beavers managers
Portland Beavers players
Reading Phillies managers
St. Cloud Rox players
Salt Lake City Bees players
San Antonio Missions players
Spokane Indians managers
Tacoma Cubs players
Toronto Blue Jays coaches